Deep RiverRock is a brand of water produced by Coca-Cola, bottled in County Antrim and sold throughout the island of Ireland.

Deep RiverRock was introduced to the market in 1994,  Still and Sparkling  bottles are available in sizes ranging from an on-the-go 330ml pack to 500ml, 750ml and 2 litre bottles.

Coca-Cola brands
Bottled water brands

https://www.deepriverrock.ie/